Amochayevsky is a rural locality (a khutor) in Cherkesovskoye Rural Settlement, Novoanninsky District, Volgograd Oblast, Russia. The population was 30 as of 2010.

Geography 
Amochayevsky is located in forest steppe on the Khopyorsko-Buzulukskaya Plain, on the bank of the Panika River, 36 km northwest of Novoanninsky (the district's administrative centre) by road. Cherkesovsky is the nearest rural locality.

References 

Rural localities in Novoanninsky District